Arabshah (also Romanized as ‘Arabshāh) is a village in Ahmadabad Rural District, Takht-e Soleyman District, Takab County, West Azerbaijan Province, Iran. At the 2006 census, its population was 386, in 69 families.

References 

Populated places in Takab County